is a Japanese recording artist. She has performed in the bands, Oranges & Lemons, Vita Nova, Marsh-Mallow, and Zabadak.

Discography

CDs 
 "Voices" (December 5, 1993 Biosphere Records)
 "Nursery Chimes" (ナーサリーチャイムス)(May 25, 1997 NTT Pub.)
 "*1" (January 23, 2002 Toera Records)
 "Puzzle" (January 23, 2002 Victor Entertainment)
 "SSS -Simply Sing Songs-" (July 24, 2003 Nippon Crown)
 "Shizen Genshō"(自然現象(means "Natural Phenomena")) (May 25, 2005 Nippon Crown)
 "*2" (December 6, 2006 Toera records)
 "YK20[audio]"(上野洋子 デビュー20周年記念ライヴ“YK20”~20周年につき初ソロ~) (March 4, 2007 tilde disc)
 "Tokyo Humming" (September 10, 2008 Geneon)

Remix CD 
 "Yoko Ueno e-mix" (March 25, 1996 Biosphere Records)

DVDs 
 "YK20[visual]" (上野洋子 デビュー20周年記念ライヴ“YK20”~20周年につき初ソロ~) (March 25, 2007 tilde disc)

Soundtracks 
 "Brigadoon Marin-To-Meran" Original Sound Track 2 (January 24, 2001 Victor Entertainment)
 ".hack// tasogare-no-yubiwa-densetsu" original sound track (February 21, 2003 Victor Entertainment)
 "Gamera: Chĩsaki Yusha-Tachi (Gamera the Brave)" Original Motion Picture Soundtrack (March 26, 2006 avex trax)
 "Dolphin-Blue~Fuji,Mouichido-sora-e/Churaumi~Okinawa Churaumi-suizokukan-e-no-shõtai" (July 4, 2007 tilde disc)

References

External links 
  
 
 
 Yoko Ueno at Oricon 

1963 births
Anime composers
Japanese composers
Japanese women composers
Japanese women singers
Living people
Singers from Tokyo